The Stevenson  family is an American family from Illinois that has included notable politicians in the Democratic Party, many of whom have been named Adlai E. Stevenson.

Notable members
Adlai Ewing Stevenson I (October 23, 1835 – June 14, 1914)
23rd Vice President of the United States, 1893–1897
United States Representative from Illinois, 1875–1877, 1879–1881
Lewis Stevenson (August 15, 1868 – April 5, 1929)
23rd Illinois Secretary of State, 1914–1917
Adlai Ewing Stevenson II (February 5, 1900 – July 14, 1965)
5th United States Ambassador to the United Nations, 1961–1965
Democratic Party presidential nominee, 1952 and 1956
31st Governor of Illinois, 1949–1953
McLean Stevenson (November 14, 1927 – February 15, 1996)
Great-great-grandson of John Turner Stevenson and Eliza Ewing through their son William Stevenson.
Actor; played Lieutenant Colonel Henry Braymore Blake in M*A*S*H, 1972-1975
Adlai Ewing Stevenson III (October 10, 1930 – September 6, 2021)
United States Senator from Illinois, 1970–1981
63rd Treasurer of Illinois, 1967–1970

Adlai Ewing Stevenson IV (born November 4, 1956)
Business executive, reporter, and journalist

External links
Booknotes interview with Jean Baker on The Stevensons: A Biography of an American Family, April 7, 1996.

 
Political families of the United States
American families of Scotch-Irish ancestry